The Western Huetar Kingdom, also called Lordship of Garabito, Kingdom of Garabito or Cacicazgo of Garabito, was an Amerindian nation located in Costa Rica. It was one of the two great indigenous kingdoms of the central part of the country, the other was the Eastern Huetar Kingdom or Lordship of El Guarco. It was made up of a confederation of smaller chieftains, subject to the authority of high chiefs who paid tribute to a major chieftain. It was located in the Central Valley of Costa Rica, spanning from the Pacific coast to the west bank of the Virilla River, following the Tárcoles river basin. At the time of the arrival of the Spaniards to Costa Rica, in the 16th century, the main towns were located in the plains of Esparza, Orotina and San Mateo, where King Garabito had his capital, who was the most important leader to sit during the Spanish conquest, in a place known as the Coyoche Valley, on the banks of the Susubres River, the current canton of San Mateo. At the time of contact, the nearby Kingdom of the Botos, located in the plains north of the Central Volcanic Mountain Range, paid tribute to the West.

References

Former monarchies of Costa Rica
16th century in Costa Rica
Indigenous peoples in Costa Rica